Fairway is a part of a water body (bay, harbor, river) containing the navigable channel (also known as a ship channel), a route suitable for ships of the larger size (with draft closer to the draft limit).

Fairway depth, width, and height 
The underwater cross-section of a ship in the channel is limited by the fairway depth and width (bridges may create restrictions for the height above the waterline). Fairway depth is a distance between the seabed/riverbed and the water surface. The fairway depth of a river varies with the season, so some standardized depth value is used, usually the one corresponding to the low navigable water level (LNWL) defined as the water level that the river stays above during almost the entire navigation season: statistically, the level shall stay below the LNWL for 20 ice-free days per year, corresponding to 5-6% of the ice-free period on European rivers. The fairway width is defined as a width of the cross-section of the river that corresponds to the fairway depth, the fairway height under the bridges is usually specified with respect to the highest navigable water level (HNWL).

Fairway and navigable channel 
The term "fairway" usually means all the navigable waters between the fairway buoys (that indicate the ends of the channel), even the routes only accessible to the lighter-draft vessels. Some authors restrict the definition to the linear approach part of a marine waterway, the approach channel leading into a port. 

Legal definitions of the navigable channel differ depending on the context. In many cases any part of water body that can be navigated is considered to be navigable waters, although in the US (per Title 33 of the United States Code) the term applies to the waters over which the US Congress has jurisdiction to regulate the commerce, individual states apply similar criteria. The courts, however, use an expanded definition and include into the scope of Title 33, for example, waters "frequented by small, pleasure-fishing crafts".  

The center of the navigable channel lies on the thalweg, so in the international river law in case of disputed borders the border is assumed to follow the thalweg, as doing otherwise would deny the navigation rights to one side.

Fairway management in Europe 
Many major European rivers (e.g., Rhine, Danube, Moselle, Meuse, and Sava) have long-established systems for waterway management. Some countries, primarily in Scandinavia, charge the ships fairway dues, fees intended to support maintenance of the fairways (e. g., dredging). The following table contains the parameters of some of the European waterways.

References

Sources 
 

Nautical terminology